Wild Cats on the Beach is a 1959  Italian-French comedy film directed by Vittorio Sala.

Cast 
Alberto Sordi: Alberto 
Rita Gam: Rita Elmont
Elsa Martinelli: Doriana
Franco Fabrizi: Nicola Ferrara
Giovanna Ralli:  Giovanna, Alberto's wife
Antonio Cifariello: Gino 
Georgia Moll: Adelina
Tiberio Murgia: Leopoldo Cinquemani
Luciana Angiolillo:  Susan 
Georges Marchal: Maurice Mont-Bret
Jacques Berthier: Pierre Morand 
Lorella De Luca: Lisa
Nino Besozzi: Carsoli
Antonio Acqua: Man on train
Luciano Mondolfo : the director

References

External links

1959 films
Italian comedy films
1959 comedy films
Films directed by Vittorio Sala
1950s Italian films